The 2023 Cork Senior A Hurling Championship is scheduled to be the fourth staging of the Cork Senior A Hurling Championship since its establishment by the Cork County Board in 2020. The draw for the group stage placings took place on 11 December 2022. The championship is scheduled to run from July to October 2023.

Team changes

To Championship

Relegated from the Cork Premier Senior Hurling Championship
 Na Piarsaigh  

Promoted from the Cork Premier Intermediate Hurling Championship
 Inniscarra

From Championship

Promoted to the Cork Premier Senior Hurling Championship
 Fr. O'Neill's

Relegated to the Cork Premier Intermediate Hurling Championship
 Ballymartle

Group A

Group A table

Group B

Group B table

Group C

Group C table

Knockout stage

Relegation playoff

Quarter-finals

Semi-finals

Final

References

External links
 Cork GAA website

Cork Senior A Hurling Championship
Cork
Cork Senior A Hurling Championship
Cork Senior A Hurling Championship